Ceres Hellenic Enterprises is a large traditional Greek ship management company based in London. It was founded by George Livanos in 1949, but family shipping interests in fact date back to 1824. It is currently run by Peter G. Livanos.

It owns, operates, buys and sells bulk carriers, container ships and tankers.

In 2000 its division Seachem Tankers Ltd. merged with the Norwegian-based Odfjell to create the Odfjell Seachem AS shipping company, one of the world's largest chemical tanker operators. In spring 2005, its tanker fleet was sold to Euronav and the company was specialised in the management of bulk cargo and LNG carriers.

The company is private and has three major divisions: DryLog Ltd. (which makes investments in other companies involved in dry bulk shipping, as well as directly owning some ships), GasLog Ltd. (which owns LNG carrier ships and manages others under contract to multinational energy companies), and TankLog Ltd. (which is the second largest shareholder of Euronav, to which as mentioned it sold its tanker fleet in 2005).

Some shares in Gaslog Ltd. (less than 50%) were sold to the public in March 2012 via an initial public offering.

The group purchases and operates merchant ships (often at distress sales) and sells them. It is a long term partner of JP Morgan Asset management for its maritime assets and investment department.

References

External links
 Ceres Hellenic Shipping Enterprises: Official Web Site

Shipping companies of Greece
Gas shipping companies